Chennur is a mandal in YSR KADAPA DISTRICT of the INDIAN state of ANDRA PRADESH.It is located in chennur MANDAL of KADAPA revenue divisions .

Geography
It has an average elevation of 115 meters (380 feet).

Demographics 
 census, Chennur had a population of 16,126. The total population constitute, 8,051 males and 8,075 females with sex ratio of 1019 females per 1000 males. 1,880 children are in the age group of 0–6 years. The average literacy rate stands at 68.99% with 9,828 literates, higher than the district average of 67.88%.

References

Villages in Kadapa district